Bernard James Carney  is an all-round Australian musician, who has worked in music since 1974. He is a songwriter, community choir director and guitar teacher, and his songs are peppered with passion and humour.  He has made nine successful albums, including "West", "Feathers and tributes", and "No time like the future". Carney was the main guest at the "Top Half Festival" near Alice Springs in June 2007 and he has regularly played at the Fairbridge Festival. He was the face of the Perth White Pages for 2010.

Carney has received four major Australian song writing awards. He has been a prominent guest at Australia's  major acoustic music festivals, including the Woodford Folk Festival in Queensland (for 10 consecutive years), The Port Fairy Folk Festival in Victoria (named Artist of the Year in 2003), and the National Folk Festival in Canberra.  He has regularly toured internationally, and has done international support concert work with Foster and Allen, Gene Pitney, Taj Mahal, Ralph McTell, and Stephane Grapelli. Carney is frequently commissioned to write songs for television, radio, and community organisations.

Carney received an Order of Australia Medal in the 2019 Queen's Birthday Honours.

References

Australian male singers
Australian songwriters
Australian guitarists
Recipients of the Medal of the Order of Australia
Living people
Indigenous Australian musicians
Year of birth missing (living people)
Australian male guitarists